The Osi or Osii were an ancient tribe dwelling beyond the Quadi, in a woody and mountainous country.  But their national customs, as well as their language, were those of the Aravisci, who Tacitus called Pannonians. They were, moreover, tributary to the Quadi and Sarmatae. The exact districts they inhabited cannot be determined, nor do we know whether they had migrated from Pannonia, or whether they were an ancient remnant of Pannonians in those districts.

Tacitus wrote:
Whether however the Aravisci migrated into Pannonia from the Osi, a German race [Germanorum natione], or whether the Osi came from the Aravisci into Germany, as both nations still retain she same language, institutions, and customs, is a doubtful matter; for as they were once equally poor and equally free, either bank had the same attractions, the same drawbacks.

...however in that case Tacitus uses the term "natio" to define the Osi in a geographical way, as shown by his other mention of them...
The Gotini and Osi are proved by their respective Gallic and Pannonian tongues, as well as by the fact of their enduring tribute, not to be Germans. Tribute is imposed on them as aliens, partly by the Sarmatæ, partly by the Quadi. The Gotini, to complete their degradation, actually work iron mines. All these nations occupy but little of the plain country, dwelling in forests and on mountain-tops. 

The ethnicity of the Osi is a matter of debate: some claim they were Germanic, others Celtic, others Dacian. But most likely the customs, manners, language and ethnicity were a mixture of two of them or all of them as was common in those areas in Central Europe and the Balkans.

References

Ancient peoples of Europe
Ancient history of Austria
Ancient tribes in Hungary
Ancient Slovakia
Early Germanic peoples